The Caproni Ca.14 was an early biplane developed by Giovanni Battista Caproni in the early 1910s.

Specifications (Ca.14)

References

Ca.014
Rotary-engined aircraft
Aircraft first flown in 1913
Biplanes
Single-engined tractor aircraft